Khalid Karami (born 29 December 1989) is a Dutch professional footballer who plays as a right back.

Club career
Karami was born in Amsterdam. Prior to joining Go Ahead Eagles in 2011, he had spells in the Dutch lower leagues with DWS and Watergraafsmeer. On 5 August 2011, he made his Eerste Divisie debut during Go Ahead Eagles' 1–0 home victory over Telstar, playing the full 90 minutes. Karami went onto appear seventy-two more times, scoring four goals for Go Ahead Eagles before making the move to fellow Eerste Divisie side Excelsior in August 2013. Later that month, he made his debut during their 1–0 away defeat against Emmen, replacing Elso Brito in the 52nd minute. During the following campaign in which Excelsior secured promotion back to the Eredivisie, Karami struggled for regular gametime, however netted his first goal for the club during their 3–3 draw with AZ. Following his debut season in the Eredivisie, Karami turned his fortunes and quickly became a key figure in Excelsior's starting eleven, featuring over 90 times in the next three years.

On 8 May 2018, Karami signed a pre-contract deal to join fellow Eredivisie side, Vitesse. Signing on a two-year deal following his imminent release from Excelsior. On 1 January 2019, it was announced Karami would spend the rest of the season on loan with NAC Breda.

Career statistics

References

External links
 
 Voetbal International profile 

Living people
1989 births
Association football fullbacks
Dutch footballers
Dutch sportspeople of Moroccan descent
AFC DWS players
Go Ahead Eagles players
Excelsior Rotterdam players
SBV Vitesse players'
NAC Breda players
Sparta Rotterdam players
Eredivisie players
Eerste Divisie players
Footballers from Amsterdam
JOS Watergraafsmeer players